Nagykónyi is a village in Tolna County, Hungary.

It was once settled by Danube Swabians. Around 1865–1880, several Danube Swabian from the Tolna settled in Slavonia, several families from Nagykónyi went to Slavonia and settled there.

References

 

Populated places in Tolna County